Dr. Heston Carter is a fictional character from the BBC soap opera Doctors, portrayed by Owen Brenman. He made his first appearance in 2008, and he continued to appear until 2018, when Brenman left Doctors, with Heston being killed in a car accident.

Storylines
Heston is first mentioned when Julia Parsons (Diane Keen) and George Woodson (Stirling Gallacher) are discussing who she is interviewing for a job role. Heston's interview does not get off to a good start as he assumes Julia to be a receptionist. Heston manages to get the job by taking Julia to the Icon for lunch, where he convinces her that he is right for the job. Julia has second thoughts due to Heston's unconventional approach to patient care and causing arguments amongst the other staff. Heston takes on the role of mentoring Simon Bond (David Sturzaker). From Lily Hassan's (Seeta Indrani) arrival at the Mill, it is clear Heston is in love with her. Despite her constant rejection, he perseveres and it is made clear at the start that she has feelings for him also. At one of the Mill's Christmas parties, Lily proposes to Heston but he rejects her.

Heston made a shocking revelation during an assertiveness class he attended with Ruth. After going too far in a role play, Ruth says it was a blessing that he had never had children to which Heston said that he was a father - once. At the beginning of October 2009, Heston's wife, Christine O'Connell played by Christine Kavanagh, and mother of his recently announced child, Steven O'Connell played by Theo Cowan, re-appeared in his life and he was determined to make sure that she didn't make his life a misery once again.

On 5 January, Heston's friend Charlie Bradfield arrives after Jimmi gets kidnapped and Charlie does Jimmi's work for him. He supported Charlie when he causes them both to get kicked out of an Indian restaurant where Charlie is accused of molesting the restaurant manager's wife.

During the later part of 2011 to the beginning of 2012 Heston began dating Marina Bonnaire. At first he saw see her charming side, but later into the relationship he saw another side to her; she would become erratic and violent towards him, even at the slightest thing (like if he missed a meal and was late home). One day Heston decided enough was enough; after dealing with a patient's case that he felt particularly passionate about, he asked Marina to leave. She packed her bags and headed off to her son Ian's house in the hope he'd take her in. The next day Heston lied to his colleagues about the situation regarding Marina's departure, saying it was in fact she who initiated the split.

Heston was a victim of a burglary, finding his home trashed and robbed. His colleagues help him to tidy up, but Heston can not fathom or cope with what has happened. He begins to replace his possessions- with the help of Dr. Kevin Tyler - but subsequently discovers his insurance was invalid, and they will not pay out for his losses. He begins to sleep with a cricket bat beside his bed, in fear that the robber will return. When his robber returns one night, Heston confronts him in his kitchen, but is threatened with a screwdriver by the robber - Curtis- who begins to leave with Heston's belongings. Heston flies into a rage and follows Curtis to the driveway and hits him with the cricket bat 3 times, rendering Curtis unconscious and bleeding from a head wound. A neighbour witnesses this after hearing the commotion, and calls the Police. 
Heston is arrested and taken to Letherbridge police station, where he lies in his preliminary interview with PC Cook (the arresting officer) and behaves in a pompous and arrogant manner, stating he is the victim and has the right to protect his home. When he is informed that only reasonable force can be used, Heston states that he only hit Curtis once and PC Cook does not believe him. Rob Hollins is shocked to find Heston in the cells, and also what he hears Heston has said- Heston had refused legal advice, which Rob tells him is a bad decision. Heston admits to Rob that he has lied about the number of times he hit Curtis.
In his second interview, PC Cook informs Heston that medical evidence suggests that Curtis has been hit more than once and that he is in surgery with bad injuries. Heston admits he may have hit Curtis more than once, and asks for a lawyer one PC Cook informs him that he will be charged with attempted murder. The Crown Prosecution Service later charges Heston, much to his shock and dismay. He had been sure that he would not be charged, and seems reluctant to accept the severity of his part in the event. All of Heston's colleagues are shocked to learn of what happened, and Cherry and Mrs. Tembe are devastated. But when Mrs. Tembe participates in some voluntary hospital work, she encounters Curtis and pleads with him to drop the charges. Curtis, however, complains about her action to the police- and Rob informs Mrs. Tembe that she cannot interfere with the case and it may damage Heston's chances in court. She is horrified. Further still, when a video of the attack appears on the internet showing Heston hitting Curtis — seemingly unarmed — his colleagues worry about what Heston will be facing at court.

In 2014, Heston begins psychological therapy after experiencing hallucinations, sleepwalking and amnesiac episodes which his doctor believes may be caused by depression. Heston dies in November 2018 after being a passenger in his own Jaguar, being driven by Dr Al Haskey. A drunk Heston distracts Al and the car crashes after swerving on manure, the car flies in to a field and Heston later succumbs in hospital later surrounded by his frantic family.

Reception 
In August 2017, Brenman was longlisted for Best Daytime Star at the Inside Soap Awards. The nomination did not progress to the viewer-voted shortlist.

References

External links
 Heston Carter at BBC Online

Doctors (2000 TV series) characters
Fictional British medical doctors
Male characters in television
Television characters introduced in 2008
Fictional victims of domestic abuse